The 2022 Hounslow London Borough Council election took place on 5 May 2022. All 62 members of Hounslow London Borough Council were elected. The elections took place alongside local elections in the other London boroughs and elections to local authorities across the United Kingdom.

In the previous election in 2018, the Labour Party maintained its control of the council, winning 51 out of the 60 seats with the Conservative Party forming the council opposition with the remaining nine seats. The 2022 election took place under new election boundaries, which increased the number of councillors to 62.

Background

History 

The thirty-two London boroughs were established in 1965 by the London Government Act 1963. They are the principal authorities in Greater London and have responsibilities including education, housing, planning, highways, social services, libraries, recreation, waste, environmental health and revenue collection. Some of the powers are shared with the Greater London Authority, which also manages passenger transport, police and fire.

Since its formation, Hounslow has generally been under Labour control, apart from a period from 1968–1971 when the Conservative Party held a majority of the seats and a period from 2006–2010 when no party had an overall majority of seats. Labour regained control of the council in the 2010 election, when they won 35 seats with 35.2% of the vote and the Conservatives won 25 seats with 32.0% of the vote. No Liberal Democrats, independents and residents' group councillors were elected in 2010, 2014 or 2018. In the 2018 Hounslow London Borough Council election, Labour extended its majority to win 51 seats with 54.1% of the vote, while the Conservatives won the remaining 9 seats, all in Chiswick, with 28.8% of the vote across the borough. The Liberal Democrats won 8.1% of the vote and the Green Party won 7.8% of the vote, but neither party won any seats.

Council term 

A Labour councillor for Heston West, Rajinder Bath, died in June 2019. He had been first elected in 1990 and had served as mayor in 1998. The former council leader and sitting Labour councillor for the Feltham North ward, John Chatt, died in August 2019. He had served as a councillor for twenty-nine years. By-elections to fill both seats were held on 12 December 2019 to coincide with the 2019 general election. Bath's seat of Heston West was won by the Labour candidate Balraj Sarai, while the Conservative Party candidate Kuldeep Tak gained Chatt's seat in Feltham North. A Labour councillor for Hounslow Heath, Hina Kiani, resigned in July 2020 for work reasons. The Labour councillor for Cranford ward, Poonam Dhillon died in January 2021. She had represented the ward since 2006–2014 and was re-elected in 2018. Due to the COVID-19 pandemic, by-elections for both seats were delayed until 6 May 2021, alongside the 2021 London mayoral election and the London Assembly election. Hounslow Heath was held for Labour by Madeeha Asim, while Cranford ward was held for Labour by Devina Ram, with the Conservatives coming in second place in both wards.

As with most London boroughs, Hounslow elected its councillors under new boundaries decided by the Local Government Boundary Commission for England, which it produced after a period of consultation. The number of councillors rose to 62, an increase from the previous 60, across eighteen three-councillor wards and four two-councillor wards.

Campaign 
Darius Nasimi, who came to the United Kingdom as an Afghan refugee in 1999, was selected as a Conservative candidate for Hanworth. The Labour councillor Theo Dennison resigned from his party after his motion of no confidence in council leader Steve Curran failed. Curran later announced he would not be seeking re-election due to illness.

Electoral process 
Hounslow, like other London borough councils, elects all of its councillors at once every four years. The previous election took place in 2018. The election took place by multi-member first-past-the-post voting, with each ward being represented by two or three councillors. Electors had as many votes as there are councillors to be elected in their ward, with the top two or three being elected.

All registered electors (British, Irish, Commonwealth and European Union citizens) living in London aged 18 or over were entitled to vote in the election. People who lived at two addresses in different councils, such as university students with different term-time and holiday addresses, were entitled to be registered for and vote in elections in both local authorities. Voting in-person at polling stations took place from 7:00 to 22:00 on election day, and voters were able to apply for postal votes or proxy votes in advance of the election.

Previous council composition

Results summary

Ward results
Source:

Bedfont

Brentford East

Brentford West

Chiswick Gunnersbury

Chiswick Homefields

Chiswick Riverside

Cranford

Feltham North

Feltham West

Hanworth Park

Hanworth Village

Heston Central

Heston East

Heston West

Hounslow Central

Hounslow East

Hounslow Heath

Hounslow South

Hounslow West

Isleworth

Osterley & Spring Grove

Syon & Brentford Lock

References 

Council elections in the London Borough of Hounslow
Hounslow